Brainerd may refer to:

Place names in the United States
 Brainerd, a neighborhood in Chicago, Illinois
 Brainerd station, a train station in Chicago
 Brainerd, Kansas, an unincorporated community
 Brainerd, Minnesota, a city
 Brainerd International Raceway, near Brainerd, Minnesota

People
 Brainerd (surname)
 Brainerd (given name)

Schools in the United States
 Brainerd Institute, a former school for African Americans in Chester, South Carolina, expanded to include Brainerd Junior College in 1934
 Brainerd High School (Minnesota), Brainerd, Minnesota
 Brainerd High School (Tennessee), Chattanooga, Tennessee
 Brainerd School, a one-room schoolhouse in Mount Holly, New Jersey

Other uses
 Brainerd (band), an American hard rock band
 Brainerd diarrhea
 Brainerd Mission, a former Christian mission to the Cherokee in present-day Chattanooga, Tennessee

See also
 East Brainerd, Tennessee
 Brainard (disambiguation)